Gabriela "Gaby" Dabrowski (born April 1, 1992) is a Canadian professional tennis player. She reached her best singles ranking of world No. 164 by the WTA on November 3, 2014 and her highest doubles ranking of world No. 4 on July 11, 2022. A two-time Grand Slam champion, she won the 2017 French Open mixed-doubles title with Rohan Bopanna, becoming the first Canadian woman to win a senior Grand Slam title. With Mate Pavić, she also won the 2018 Australian Open mixed doubles title.

Early life
Dabrowski is of Polish origin and speaks English, French, and Polish. Dabrowski played in her first provincial tournament when she was 8. Her first big victory was at the provincial 10-and-under Future Stars at 9 years old. Dabrowski was a finalist at the Ontario 14-and-under Provincial Championships and finished in the top 8 at the 14-and-under National Championships. During her teens, she chose to start training at Saddlebrook Academies in Tampa.

Tennis career

2006–12: Early years
At the beginning of 2006, she became the first Canadian to win Les Petits As, one of the most prestigious 14 and under tournaments in the world. In December 2006, Dabrowski reached the doubles final of the 16-and-under Orange Bowl in Miami. Dabrowski also won the Junior Orange Bowl in December 2009 where she defeated top-seeded Kristina Mladenovic. She was the first Canadian to capture the title since Carling Bassett-Seguso did it as a 15-year-old in 1982. At the junior event of the Australian Open in January 2010, Dabrowski was a runner-up in doubles with partner Tímea Babos. She finished 2010 ranked fifth in the junior rankings, and so decided to transition to the professional level. In November 2011, she made it to her first professional singles final at the $50k tournament in Toronto, but lost to qualifier Amra Sadiković. Dabrowski reached, in November 2012, the semifinals of the $75k Challenger in Phoenix.

2013: First WTA doubles final
At the end of May, Dabrowski reached the first WTA final of her career, with partner Shahar Pe'er, at the Premier tournament in Brussels. They were defeated by Anna-Lena Grönefeld and Květa Peschke in the final. At the beginning of July at a $50k in Waterloo, Dabrowski made it to the second professional singles final of her career. She was defeated by Julia Glushko. At the Rogers Cup in August, Dabrowski reached the semifinals in doubles with compatriot Sharon Fichman after upsetting first seeds Sara Errani and Roberta Vinci the round before. They lost to Jelena Janković and Katarina Srebotnik. In October, Dabrowski (with partner Alicja Rosolska) reached her second WTA doubles final at Linz. They were eliminated by twin sisters Karolína and Kristýna Plíšková in the final. Dabrowski reached the third singles final of her career at the inaugural $50k SSIR Pro Classic in November, but lost to Mandy Minella.

2014: First WTA doubles title and career-high ranking in singles

At her first tournament of the season, the $25k in Vero Beach, Dabrowski reached the fourth singles final of her career but was defeated by Laura Siegemund. At the French Open, she made it to the second round of the doubles event with Alicja Rosolska. In July at the Swedish Open, Dabrowski qualified for her first WTA main-draw and upset world No. 39, Camila Giorgi, in the opening round, her first top-50 win. She was eliminated in three sets by Mona Barthel in the next round. At the beginning of August at the Washington Open, Dabrowski won the first WTA doubles title of her career. She defeated, with partner Shuko Aoyama, Hiroko Kuwata and Kurumi Nara in straight sets in the final. At the US Open, she reached the third round in doubles with Rosolska. In November, Dabrowski made it to the final of the $50k Tevlin Challenger where she won her first professional singles title over Maria Sanchez.

2015: Pan American Games champion in doubles
At the Australian Open, Dabrowski and partner Rosolska reached the third round of the doubles event with an upset over second seeds Hsieh Su-wei and Sania Mirza. They were eliminated by Michaëlla Krajicek and Barbora Záhlavová-Strýcová in three sets. At the Dubai Championships, Dabrowski qualified for her first WTA Premier main-draw with a win over world No. 69, Julia Görges. She lost to Çağla Büyükakçay in three sets in the opening round. In March, at the Monterrey Open, Dabrowski won her second WTA doubles title when she defeated, along partner Rosolska, the Rodionova sisters. In May, she reached the quarterfinals in doubles at the Premier 5 Italian Open. At her next tournament, the Internationaux de Strasbourg, she qualified for her third WTA Tour main draw but lost to Elena Vesnina, in the first round. At the Pan American Games in July, Dabrowski won a gold medal in doubles with Carol Zhao and a silver medal in mixed doubles with Philip Bester. In August at the Rogers Cup, she was awarded a wildcard for the singles main draw but was eliminated in the first round by world No. 26 Flavia Pennetta.

2016: First Olympic experience
In February, Dabrowski and María José Martínez Sánchez reached the semifinals of the WTA Premier 5 in Doha. In June, she reached the doubles final of the WTA International in Nottingham with Yang Zhaoxuan. The next week at the inaugural Mallorca Open, she won her third WTA doubles title, this time with partner Martínez Sánchez. At Wimbledon, Dabrowski continued her partnership with the Spaniard. In the opening round, she triumphed against fellow Canadian Eugenie Bouchard and her partner Sabine Lisicki in straight sets, to reach the second round for the first time. In the next round, against Anabel Medina Garrigues and Arantxa Parra Santonja, the duo failed to close out the match and squandered a 6–4, 5–2 lead, and ended up losing in three sets. At the Rio Olympics in August, she advanced to the second round with compatriot Bouchard. In October, Dabrowski and partner Martínez Sánchez reached the semifinals at the Premier Mandatory in Beijing. She won the second singles title of her career in November at the 25k in Nashville, where she defeated Jennifer Elie in straight sets.

2017: Partnership with Xu Yifan, first Grand Slam title in mixed doubles
In January at the Hobart International, Dabrowski reached the final in doubles with Yang Zhaoxuan. In April, she won her first Premier Mandatory doubles title in Miami after defeating, with new partner Xu Yifan, the third seeds Sania Mirza and Barbora Strýcová in the final. In May, she qualified for the tournament in Rabat, achieving this feat for the fourth time in her career and the first since 2015. She defeated Lina Qostal in her opener for her second WTA main draw win but lost to Francesca Schiavone in the second round.

At the French Open, Dabrowski reached the third round in doubles and won the title in mixed doubles with Rohan Bopanna, becoming the first Canadian woman to win a Grand Slam title. At the WTA Premier event in New Haven, she captured her second doubles title of the season, also her second with partner Xu Yifan. At the US Open, she advanced to the quarterfinals in both doubles and mixed doubles. In September at the Tournoi de Québec, she qualified for her second WTA main draw of the season where she lost to defending champion Océane Dodin in the first round, in three sets. In October, Dabrowski qualified for her first WTA Finals with Xu Yifan, but lost in the quarterfinals to defending champions, Ekaterina Makarova and Elena Vesnina.

2018: Second Grand Slam title and top-10 debut in doubles
In January, Dabrowski won her sixth WTA doubles title and her third with partner Xu Yifan at the Premier event in Sydney. At the Australian Open, she reached the quarterfinals in women's doubles with Xu Yifan and won the mixed-doubles event with Mate Pavić, her second Grand Slam title. In February, she won the second biggest WTA doubles title of her career to date with a victory at the Premier 5 in Doha with Jeļena Ostapenko. With this win, she became only the fourth Canadian female player to reach the top 10 in singles or doubles, with a debut at No. 8. At the French Open, Dabrowski reached the final in mixed doubles for the second straight year, this time with Pavić, but failed to defend her title with a loss to Latisha Chan and Ivan Dodig. She also made it to the third round in doubles with Xu.

2019: First Grand Slam doubles final
In May, Dabrowski and Xu were runners-up in the Madrid Open, which they followed up by winning the Nuremberg Cup. In June, they reached the quarterfinal of the French Open. 

They reached the final of Wimbledon, losing to Hsieh Su-wei and Barbora Strýcová. In August, they reached the semifinal of the Rogers Cup, and two weeks later reached the quarterfinals of the US Open. Their performance during the year earned them a place in the WTA Finals, but they went out at the round robin stage. Dabrowski and Pavić reached the final of the French Open for the second successive year, but were again beaten by Chan and Dodig.

2020–2021: WTA 1000 title, Six WTA finals, Historic world No. 5 in doubles
Dabrowski reached the finals of the Premier event in Adelaide playing with Darija Jurak. At the Australian Open, she reached the quarterfinals in women's doubles with Jeļena Ostapenko, and the semifinals of mixed doubles with Henri Kontinen. With Ostapenko, she reached also the WTA 1000 event final at the Qatar Open. 

She reached another Premier final in October 2020, in Ostrava, playing with new partner Luisa Stefani. Seeded fifth, Dabrowski won her third WTA 1000 and first with Stefani at the Canadian Open, avenging their loss in the Silicon Valley Classic final to Darija Jurak and Andreja Klepač. The following week, they followed this successful run by another, reaching the WTA 1000 final at the Cincinnati Open by defeating current Olympic champions, second seeded pair Krejcikova/Siniakova. They lost the final to Sam Stosur and Zhang Shuai. In their first major together, the duo reached the semifinals of the US Open, where they were forced to retire once Stefani injured her knee. On October 18th, Dabrowski ascended to world No. 5 in the WTA doubles rankings, thus becoming the highest ranked Canadian ever in the discipline.

2022: New partnership and first Masters 1000 title with Olmos, World No. 4
Dabrowski announced she will play the 2022 season with Giuliana Olmos, with whom she had partnered to reach the semifinals at the 2021 Miami Open, but stated she could be open to play again with Stefani. Seeded second, they went on to win their first Masters together at the Madrid Open. Dabrowski and Olmos followed that by also reaching the finals in the Italian Open. She reached a career high doubles ranking of No. 4 on 11 July 2022.

In September, Dabrowski reunited with Stefani in her return to WTA Tour and won with her the 2022 Chennai Open, afterwards getting the 2022 Toray Pan Pacific Open title with Olmos, both titles without losing a single set.
Following this successful runs, on 26 September 2022, she qualified for her fourth WTA Finals with Olmos in their first appearance as a team.

World TeamTennis
Dabrowski made her World TeamTennis as a wildcard player for the Philadelphia Freedoms. She returned as a roster player for the Orange County Breakers in the 2020 season at The Greenbrier.

Grand Slam tournament finals

Women's doubles: 1 (runner-up)

Mixed doubles: 4 (2 titles, 2 runner-ups)

Other significant finals

WTA 1000 tournaments

Doubles: 10 (4 titles, 6 runner-ups)

WTA career finals

Doubles: 28 (13 titles, 15 runner-ups)

Performance timelines

Singles
Current through the 2021 Dubai Tennis Championships.

Doubles
Current after the 2022 US Open.

Notes
 The first Premier 5 event of the year has switched back and forth between the Dubai Tennis Championships and the Qatar Ladies Open since 2009. Dubai was classified as a Premier 5 event from 2009–2011 before being succeeded by Doha for the 2012–2014 period. Since 2015, the two tournaments alternate between Premier 5 and Premier status every year.

 In 2014, the Pan Pacific Open was downgraded to a Premier event and replaced by the Wuhan Open.

Mixed doubles
Current through the 2023 Australian Open.

ITF Circuit finals

Singles: 6 (2 titles, 4 runner-ups)

Doubles: 20 (12 titles, 8 runner-ups)

Junior Grand Slam finals

Doubles: 1 (runner-up)

Record against top-100 players
Dabrowski's win–loss record (9–32, 22%) against players who were ranked world No. 100 or higher when played is as follows: Players who have been ranked world No. 1 are in boldface.

 Alicia Molik 1–0
 Julia Görges 1–0
 Mirjana Lučić-Baroni 1–0
 Mandy Minella 1–0
 Nao Hibino 1–0
 Irina Khromacheva 1–0
 Karolína Plíšková 1–1
 Camila Giorgi 1–1 
 Jana Čepelová 1–1
 Garbiñe Muguruza 0–1
 Caroline Wozniacki 0–1
 Kimiko Date-Krumm 0–1
 Francesca Schiavone 0–1
 Flavia Pennetta 0–1
 Beatriz Haddad Maia 0–1
 Johanna Konta 0–1 
 Alizé Cornet 0–1
 Yanina Wickmayer 0–1
 Elena Vesnina 0–1
 CoCo Vandeweghe 0–1
 Varvara Lepchenko 0–1
 Mona Barthel 0–1
 Jamie Hampton 0–1
 Alexandra Dulgheru 0–1
 Anna Karolína Schmiedlová 0–1
 Monica Niculescu 0–1
 Kateryna Bondarenko 0–1
 Misaki Doi 0–1
 Zarina Diyas 0–1
 Martina Müller 0–1
 Lesia Tsurenko 0–1
 Pauline Parmentier 0–1
 Océane Dodin 0–1
 Denisa Allertová 0–1
 Irina Falconi 0–1  
 Evgeniya Rodina 0–1
 Ekaterina Alexandrova 0–1
 Tereza Smitková 0–2

* statistics as of 17 January 2021

Notes

References

External links

 
 
 

1992 births
Living people
Canadian female tennis players
Racket sportspeople from Ontario
Sportspeople from Ottawa
Canadian people of Polish descent
Grand Slam (tennis) champions in mixed doubles
Australian Open (tennis) champions
French Open champions
Olympic tennis players of Canada
Tennis players at the 2016 Summer Olympics
Tennis players at the 2011 Pan American Games
Tennis players at the 2015 Pan American Games
Pan American Games gold medalists for Canada
Pan American Games silver medalists for Canada
Pan American Games medalists in tennis
Medalists at the 2015 Pan American Games
Tennis players at the 2020 Summer Olympics
20th-century Canadian women
21st-century Canadian women